Californian Soil is the third studio album by English indie pop band London Grammar, released on 16 April 2021 by Metal & Dust and Ministry of Sound. It was initially intended to be released on 12 February 2021, but was postponed for unknown reasons.

Californian Soil was preceded by four singles—"Baby It's You", the title track, "Lose Your Head" and "How Does It Feel".

Composition
Thematically, although it remains a collaborative effort with the rest of the band, the album is vocalist Hannah Reid's 'story'. Reid said the album deals with themes of feminism and fame. She wrote:"This record is about gaining possession of my own life. You imagine success will be amazing. Then you see it from the inside and ask, 'Why am I not controlling this thing? Why am I not allowed to be in control of it? And does that connect, in any way to being a woman? If so, how can I do that differently?.Reid stated that things need to be different from her efforts on the preceding album (Truth Is a Beautiful Thing); "I wasn’t making myself very vulnerable and I didn’t feel like I was taking any risks." The songwriting was influenced by Reid's ultimatum for change following years of sexism and misogyny within the music industry; “I did say to Dan and Dot, ‘I don’t want this to end, but something does have to change because I just can’t keep doing my best work or going out on the road if I’m going to come back and feel this way.'" In particular, I Need the Night addresses Reid's experiences with the music industry. America also ruminates on Reid's toxic experiences despite the fame, her fibromyalgia diagnosis and the contrasts between poverty and beauty while travelling.  Major emphasised that the band supported Reid's direction for the album; "lyrically, Californian Soil is very much about Hannah’s experience as a woman, and we wanted that message to come through as loud as possible"

Production 
Writing and demoing for the album began in 2017 at Rothamn's home, in his hidden 'Narnia' studio. It was the first time the band had begun production on an album without an executive producer. How Does It Feel and Call Your Friends were written initially by Reid and producer Steve Mac in separate writing sessions, before eventually the rest of the band finalised the songs. Reid acknowledged that the album's external producers - Mac, George FitzGerald and Charlie Andrew - were all male, which stands out given the album's feminist themes; "it was a big conflict within me...It’s changing now but there aren’t many female producers out there. That’s something that I really hope can change and it’s something that I do want to think about for a fourth album." The album was completed in 2019, and initially scheduled for a 2020 release. However, the band chose to delay the release to 2021 due to the pandemic; "we felt this was the most upbeat album we have probably ever made. In the middle of a pandemic, there is a risk that this just won’t connect right now. There was no rush and I’m glad we waited.”

Release
The album was announced on 1 October 2020, alongside the release of the title track. The band said the track was a "turning point" for them, deciding to name the album after the song.

On 5 January 2021, the band posted on their Twitter page that the release date had been postponed to 9 April of that same year, before being subsequently pushed back to 16 April. No reason was given for either delay.

Promotion

Singles
Californian Soil was preceded by four singles: "Baby It's You", released on 19 August 2020, the title track, released on 1 October 2020, "Lose Your Head", released on 4 January 2021 and "How Does It Feel" on 12 March 2021. "Lord It's a Feeling" was released as the fifth single on 21 May 2021.

Critical reception

Californian Soil received generally positive reviews from music critics. On Metacritic, which assigns a normalised score out of 100 to ratings from publications, the album received an average score of 77 based on 10 reviews. Christopher Hamilton-Peach of The Line of Best Fit said that "London Grammar use Californian Soil to hone their lush sonics and embrace the future". Hannah Mylrea of NME wrote that "London Grammar are revitalised...[they] are more confident, and more fun, than they’ve ever been."

The Guardian Alim Kheraj stated that "the British trio stick to boilerplate emoting and bland imagery, but there are small sonic steps forward". Writing for Pitchfork, Hannah Jocelyn wrote that "the UK electronic-pop trio's third album draws on a renewed sense of extroversion and energy, which can't always overcome its lyrical and production missteps." Praising the album's surrealist sound and tone, The Daily Telegraph Neil McCormick said that the album was "hypnotically compelling". However, Slant Magazine Charles Lyons-Burt felt that "the band's willingness to harness the latest sonic trends is hit and (mostly) miss."

Track listing

Notes
  signifies an additional producer

Personnel
Credits adapted from the liner notes of Californian Soil.

London Grammar
 Hannah Reid – vocals, keys, programming
 Daniel Rothman – guitars, keys, programming
 Dot Major – drums, keys, programming

Additional musicians

 Sally Herbert – string arrangements, conducting 
 Olli Cunningham – score supervision
 Everton Nelson – string leader, violin 
 Bruce White – viola 
 Claire Orsler – viola 
 Rachel Robson – viola 
 Alison Dods – violin 
 Ian Humphries – violin 
 Julia Singleton – violin 
 Marianne Haynes – violin 
 Richard George – violin 
 Rick Koster – violin 
 Warren Zielinski – violin 
 Chris Laurence – double bass 
 Chris Dorsey – cello 
 Ian Burdge – cello 
 Tony Woollard – cello 
 Kirsty Mangan – original string arrangements, additional keys ; viola, violin ; string arrangements 
 Rachael Lander – cello 
 Andy Marshall – double bass 
 Vula Malinga – backing vocals ; additional vocals 
 Sharlene Hector – backing vocals 
 Mike Hough – backing vocals 
 Phebe Edwards – backing vocals 
 Brendan Reilly – backing vocals 
 George FitzGerald – additional pads, effects ; additional programming 
 Hal Ritson – additional guitar 
 Steve Mac – additional keyboards 
 Chris Laws – additional drums 
 My Riot – additional programming 
 Hoskins – additional programming

Technical

 Robbie Nelson – string recording 
 London Grammar – production
 Charlie Andrew – production 
 George FitzGerald – production ; additional production 
 Steve Mac – production 
 My Riot – additional vocal recording 
 Tom Elmhirst – mixing 
 Matthew Scatchell – engineering for mix 
 Nathan Boddy – mixing 
 Serban Ghenea – mixing 
 John Hanes – engineering for mix 
 Matt Wiggins – engineering 
 Jay Pocknell – engineering 
 Dann Pursey – engineering 
 Chris Laws – engineering 
 Chris Gehringer – mastering

Artwork
 Crowns & Owls – creative direction, photography
 Catalogue – graphic design

Charts

Weekly charts

Year-end charts

Certifications

Release history

Notes

References

2021 albums
Albums produced by Charlie Andrew
Albums produced by George FitzGerald (musician)
Albums recorded at RAK Studios
London Grammar albums
Ministry of Sound albums